Beechcraft is an American brand of civil aviation and military aircraft owned by Textron Aviation since 2014, headquartered in Wichita, Kansas. Originally, it was a brand of Beech Aircraft Corporation, an American manufacturer of general aviation, commercial, and military aircraft, ranging from light single-engined aircraft to twin-engined turboprop transports, business jets, and military trainers. Beech later became a division of Raytheon and then Hawker Beechcraft before a bankruptcy sale turned its assets over to Textron (parent company of Beech's historical cross-town Wichita rival, Cessna Aircraft Company). It remains a brand of Textron Aviation.

History

Beech Aircraft Company was founded in Wichita, Kansas, in 1932 by Walter Beech as president, his wife Olive Ann Beech as secretary, Ted A. Wells as vice president of engineering, K. K. Shaul as treasurer, and investor C. G. Yankey as vice president. The company began operations in an idle Cessna factory. With designer Ted Wells, they developed the first aircraft under the Beechcraft name, the classic Beechcraft Model 17 Staggerwing, which first flew in November 1932. Over 750 Staggerwings were built, with 352 manufactured for the United States Army Air Forces and 67 for the United States Navy during World War II.

Beechcraft was not Beech's first company, as he had previously formed Travel Air in 1924 and the design numbers used at Beechcraft followed the sequence started at Travel Air, and were then continued at Curtiss-Wright, after Travel Air had been absorbed into the much larger company in 1929. Beech became president of the Curtiss-Wright's airplane division and VP of sales, but became dissatisfied with being so far removed from aircraft production and quit to form Beechcraft, using the original Travel Air facilities and employing many of the same people. Model numbers prior to 11/11000 were built under the "Travel Air" name, while Curtiss-Wright built the CW-12, 14, 15, and 16 as well as previous successful Travel Air models (mostly the model 4).

In 1942 Beech won its first Army-Navy "E" Award production award and became one of the elite five percent of war contracting firms in the country to win five straight awards for production efficiency, mostly for the production of the Beechcraft Model 18 which remains in widespread use worldwide. Beechcraft ranked 69th among United States corporations in the value of World War II military production contracts.

After the war, the Staggerwing was replaced by the revolutionary Beechcraft Bonanza with a distinctive V-tail. Perhaps the best known Beech aircraft, the single-engined Bonanza has been manufactured in various models since 1947. The Bonanza has had the longest production run of any airplane, past or present, in the world. Other important Beech aircraft are the King Air and Super King Air line of twin-engined turboprops, in production since 1964, the Baron, a twin-engined variant of the Bonanza, and the Beechcraft Model 18, originally a business transport and commuter airliner from the late 1930s through the 1960s, which remains in active service as a cargo transport.

In 1950, Olive Ann Beech was installed as president and CEO of the company, after the sudden death of her husband from a heart attack on November 29 of that year. She continued as CEO until Beech was purchased by Raytheon Company on February 8, 1980. Ted Wells had been replaced as chief engineer by Herbert Rawdon, who remained at the post until his retirement in the early 1960s.

Throughout much of the mid-to-late 20th century, Beechcraft was considered one of the "Big Three" in the field of general aviation manufacturing, along with Cessna and Piper Aircraft.

In 1994, Raytheon merged Beechcraft with the Hawker product line it had acquired in 1993 from British Aerospace, forming Raytheon Aircraft Company. In 2002, the Beechcraft brand was revived to again designate the Wichita-produced aircraft. In 2006, Raytheon sold Raytheon Aircraft to Goldman Sachs creating Hawker Beechcraft. Since its inception Beechcraft has resided in Wichita, Kansas, also the home of chief competitor Cessna, the birthplace of Learjet and of Stearman, whose trainers were used in large numbers during WW II.

The entry into bankruptcy of Hawker Beechcraft on May 3, 2012 ended with its emergence on February 16, 2013 as a new entity, Beechcraft Corporation, with the Hawker Beechcraft name being retired. The new and much smaller company produce the King Air line of aircraft as well as the T-6 and AT-6 military trainer/attack aircraft, as well as the piston-powered single-engined Bonanza and twin-engined Baron aircraft. The jet line was discontinued, but the new company continues to support the aircraft already produced with parts, plus engineering and airworthiness documentation.

By October 2013, the company, now financially turned around, was up for sale.

On December 26, 2013, Textron agreed to purchase Beechcraft, including the discontinued Hawker jet line, for $1.4 billion. The sale was concluded in the first half of 2014, with government approval. Textron CEO Scott Donnelly indicated that Beechcraft and Cessna would be combined to form a new light aircraft manufacturing concern, Textron Aviation, that would result in US$65M–$85M in annual savings over keeping the companies separate. Textron has kept both the Beechcraft and Cessna names as separate brands.

Products

As of July 2019, Textron Aviation was producing the following models under the Beechcraft brand name:

 Beechcraft Bonanza series – single-engined piston general aviation aircraft
 Beechcraft Baron – twin-engined piston utility aircraft
 Beechcraft Denali 
 (Super) King Air
C-12 Huron (military version)
 Beechcraft T-6 Texan II/CT-156 Harvard II – single-engined turboprop military trainer, based on Pilatus PC-9

Facilities

 Beech Factory Airport – houses Beechcraft's head office, manufacturing facility, and runway for test flights

See also
 Beech Aircraft Corp. v. Rainey

References

Notes

Bibliography

External links

 Beechcraft website
 Beechcraft Heritage Museum
 Aerofiles – Beechcraft model information
 Aircraft-Info.net – Beechcraft

 
Aircraft manufacturers of the United States
Companies based in Wichita, Kansas
Manufacturing companies based in Kansas
Manufacturing companies established in 1932
1932 establishments in Kansas
Textron
2014 mergers and acquisitions
Companies that filed for Chapter 11 bankruptcy in 2012
American companies established in 1932
American brands